Landsat 1 (LS-1), formerly named ERTS-A and ERTS-1, was the first satellite of the United States' Landsat program. It was a modified version of the Nimbus 4 meteorological satellite and was launched on July 23, 1972, by a Delta 900 rocket from Vandenberg Air Force Base in California.

It was the first satellite to carry a Multispectral Scanner.

The near-polar orbiting spacecraft served as a stabilized, Earth-oriented platform for obtaining information on agricultural and forestry resources, geology and mineral resources, hydrology and water resources, geography, cartography, environmental pollution, oceanography and marine resources, and meteorological phenomena.

Background
The multi-agency Earth Resources Satellites Program was begun in 1966 by the Department of the Interior. The goal of the program was to gather data from the Earth via remote sensing techniques. The following year a feasibility study was performed for the Earth Resources Technology Satellite. The Bureau of Budget (BOB) did not grant funding to build the satellite, but provided $2 million to continue the feasibility studies.

Satellite design

Development
Definition studies for two Earth observation satellites began in 1967. The satellites were named Earth Resources Technology Satellite and were individually known as ERTS-A and ERTS-B.

In 1970, General Electric was selected as the prime contractor for ERTS-A. It was manufactured by GE's Space Division in Valley Forge, Pennsylvania.

Operation

The main spacecraft propulsion was three hydrazine thrusters. An attitude control system permitted the spacecraft's orientation to be maintained within plus or minus 0.7 degrees in all three axes.

Spacecraft communications included a command subsystem operating at 154.2 and 2106.4 MHz and a PCM narrow-band telemetry subsystem, operating at 2287.5 and 137.86 MHz, for spacecraft housekeeping, attitude, and sensor performance data. Video data from the three-camera RBV system was transmitted in both real-time and tape recorder modes at 2265.5 MHz, while information from the MSS was constrained to a 20 MHz radio-frequency bandwidth at 2229.5 MHz.

The satellite also carried two wide-band video tape recorders (WBVTR) capable of storing up to 30 minutes of scanner or camera data, giving the spacecraft's sensors a near-global coverage capability.

The satellite was also equipped with a data collection system (DCS) to collect information from remote, individually equipped ground stations and to relay the data to central acquisition stations. Due to the orbit of the satellite, data could be obtained at a minimum of every 12 hours. No data processing or signal multiplexing occurred on the satellite. The design of the DCS came from the Nimbus-3 platform, then known as the interrogation, recording, and location system (IRLS).

Sensors
ERTS-A had two sensors to achieve its primary objectives: the return beam vidicon (RBV) and the multispectral scanner (MSS).

The RBV was manufactured by the Radio Corporation of America (RCA). The RBV obtained visible light and near infrared photographic images of Earth. At launch, the RBV was considered the primary sensor.

The MSS was designed by Virginia Norwood at Hughes Aircraft Company, which also manufactured it. Norwood is called "The Mother of Landsat." The sensor was considered an experimental sensor, and was the secondary sensor, until scientists reviewed the data that was beamed back to Earth. After the data was reviewed, the MSS was considered the primary sensor. The MSS was a four-channel scanner that obtained radiometric images of Earth.

Mission

Launch
ERTS-A was launched July 23, 1972, on a Delta 0900 out of Vandenberg Air Force Base in California. The spacecraft was placed in a sun-synchronous orbit, with an altitude between 907 and 915 km. The spacecraft was placed in an orbit with an inclination of 99 degrees which orbited the Earth every 103 minutes. It was the first satellite launched with the sole purpose of studying and monitoring the planet.

Upon reaching orbit, it was renamed to ERTS-1. On January 14, 1975, eight days before ERTS-B was to launch, NASA announced that ERTS-1 was renamed Landsat 1 and ERTS-B would be Landsat 2 after launch.

Operations
Landsat 1's tape recorders malfunctioned in January 1978, and the satellite was taken out of service.

Results

From launch until 1974, Landsat 1 transmitted over 100,000 images, which covered more than 75% of the Earth's surface. The majority of these images were taken with the multispectral scanner. On 5 August 1972 the return beam vidicon failed after taking only 1690 images.

In 1976, Landsat 1 discovered a tiny uninhabited island 20 kilometers off the eastern coast of Canada. This island was thereafter designated Landsat Island after the satellite.

The MSS provided more than 300,000 images over the lifespan of the satellite. NASA oversaw 300 researchers that evaluated the data that Landsat 1 transmitted back to Earth.

Landsat 1 images were used in the first study of the normalized difference vegetation index (NDVI), now an ubiquitous measure of global plant greenness.

Notes

References

External links
NASA film, Earth Resources Technology Satellite (ERTS), at the National Archives

Landsat program
Spacecraft launched in 1972
Spacecraft launched by Delta rockets